Clark Godwin (born 8 November 1955) is a Bermudian athlete. He competed in the men's high jump at the 1976 Summer Olympics.

References

1955 births
Living people
Athletes (track and field) at the 1974 British Commonwealth Games
Commonwealth Games competitors for Bermuda
Athletes (track and field) at the 1975 Pan American Games
Pan American Games competitors for Bermuda
Athletes (track and field) at the 1976 Summer Olympics
Bermudian male high jumpers
Olympic athletes of Bermuda
Place of birth missing (living people)